Thomas B. Dunstan (January 4, 1850 – May 23, 1902) was an American politician who served as the 30th lieutenant governor of Michigan from 1897 to 1899. He previously served in the Michigan House of Representatives from the Ontonagon district from 1883 to 1884 and in the Michigan Senate from the 32nd district from 1889 to 1890. he died at age 52 in Chicago.

References

1850 births
1902 deaths
Republican Party members of the Michigan House of Representatives
Republican Party Michigan state senators
Lieutenant Governors of Michigan
19th-century American politicians